Pleuranthodium is a genus of plants in the ginger family. Of the 23 known species, 21 are endemic to New Guinea, one to Queensland and one to the Bismarck Archipelago.

 Pleuranthodium biligulatum (Valeton) R.M.Sm. - New Guinea
 Pleuranthodium branderhorstii (Valeton) R.M.Sm. - New Guinea
 Pleuranthodium comptum (K.Schum.) R.M.Sm. - New Guinea
 Pleuranthodium floccosum (Valeton) R.M.Sm. - New Guinea
 Pleuranthodium floribundum (K.Schum.) R.M.Sm. - New Guinea
 Pleuranthodium gjellerupii (Valeton) R.M.Sm. - New Guinea
 Pleuranthodium hellwigii (K.Schum.) R.M.Sm. - New Guinea
 Pleuranthodium iboense (Valeton) R.M.Sm. - New Guinea
 Pleuranthodium macropycnanthum (Valeton) R.M.Sm. - New Guinea
 Pleuranthodium neragaimae (Gilli) R.M.Sm. - New Guinea
 Pleuranthodium papilionaceum (K.Schum.) R.M.Sm. - New Guinea
 Pleuranthodium pedicellatum (Valeton) R.M.Sm. - New Guinea
 Pleuranthodium peekelii (Valeton) R.M.Sm. - Bismarck Archipelago
 Pleuranthodium pelecystylum (K.Schum.) R.M.Sm. - New Guinea
 Pleuranthodium piundaundensis (P.Royen) R.M.Sm. - New Guinea
 Pleuranthodium platynema (K.Schum.) R.M.Sm. - New Guinea
 Pleuranthodium pterocarpum (K.Schum.) R.M.Sm. - New Guinea
 Pleuranthodium racemigerum (F.Muell.) R.M.Sm. - Queensland
 Pleuranthodium roemeri (Valeton) R.M.Sm. - New Guinea
 Pleuranthodium schlechteri (K.Schum.) R.M.Sm. - New Guinea
 Pleuranthodium scyphonema (K.Schum.) R.M.Sm. - New Guinea
 Pleuranthodium tephrochlamys (K.Schum. & Lauterb.) R.M.Sm. - New Guinea
 Pleuranthodium trichocalyx (Valeton) R.M.Sm. - New Guinea

References

 
Zingiberaceae genera
Endemic flora of New Guinea
Taxa named by Rosemary Margaret Smith